Katherine St. John is a professor at the CUNY Graduate Center Department of Computer Science and at Lehman College Department of Mathematics and Computer Science.  She is a faculty member at the New York Consortium in Evolutionary Primatology.  In 2007 she was selected to be an AWM/MAA Falconer Lecturer
where she gave a presentation on "Comparing Evolutionary Trees".

External links
 http://www.agnesscott.edu/lriddle/women/prizes.htm
 http://dblp.uni-trier.de/pers/hd/j/John:Katherine_St=
 http://comet.lehman.cuny.edu/stjohn/research/index.html
 http://www.nycep.org/faculty

American bioinformaticians
American women computer scientists
Living people
Year of birth missing (living people)
21st-century American women